Richard Richardson (June 23, 1820 – January 8, 1885) was an Ontario political figure. He represented Norfolk South in the Legislative Assembly of Ontario from 1875 to 1879 as a Conservative member.

He was born in Lincoln, Lincolnshire, England in 1820, the son of Richard Richardson. In 1844, he married Louisa Munro. Richardson served as reeve for Walsingham Township. He was captain in the local militia.

External links 
The Canadian parliamentary companion and annual register, 1879, CH Mackintosh

1820 births
1885 deaths
Progressive Conservative Party of Ontario MPPs